The Great Seal of the State of Alabama is the state seal of the U.S. state of Alabama.

Seal of 1817

The first seal was designed in 1817 by William Wyatt Bibb, the governor of the Alabama Territory and the subsequent first governor of the state. When Alabama became a state in 1819, the state legislature adopted the design as the official state seal. The seal prominently features a map showing one of the state's most valuable resources—its major rivers. The map was shown affixed to a living tree, with no motto.

Seal of 1868
The design was replaced with a new seal on December 29, 1868, featuring an American bald eagle with a U.S. shield. The law describes the design thus:

The seal is in the form of a circle, and two and a quarter inches in diameter; near the edge is the word 'ALABAMA' and opposite, at the same distance from the edge, are the words 'GREAT SEAL.' In the centre of the seal an eagle is represented with raised wings alighting upon the national shield, with three arrows in his left talon. The eagle holds in his beak a streamer, on which immediately over the wings are the words 'HERE WE REST.' The crest-word, which give name to the State, signifies "The land of rest."

This design is still used by the Alabama Department of Labor.

Seal of 1939

In 1939, at the request of Governor Frank M. Dixon, the original concept of a map design was returned to use. The new seal was adopted during a special session called by the Governor. The design was described as follows:

The seal shall be circular, and the diameter there of two and a quarter inches; near the edge of the circle shall be the word "Alabama," and opposite this word, at the same distance from the edge, shall be the words, "Great Seal." In the center of the seal there shall be a representation of a map of the state with its principal rivers. The seal shall be called the "Great Seal of the State of Alabama." The seal shall be kept and used as required by the Constitution and laws.

The use of stars in the border, the specific design of the letterforms and the map image, the labeling of adjacent states and the Gulf of Mexico, and the application of colors to the seal are not described in the law.

Seals of the government of Alabama 
There are several seals of the government of Alabama, which use a variety of designs, including the coat of arms of Alabama, the state seal, and other distinct elements.

See also

Coat of arms of Alabama
Flag of Alabama

References

External links

 The former "here we rest" seal

Alabama
Symbols of Alabama
Alabama